Argüero (variant: San Mamés de Argüero) is one of 41 parishes (administrative divisions) in Villaviciosa, a municipality within the province and autonomous community of Asturias, in northern Spain. 

The postal code is 33314.

Villages and hamlets
 Argüero
 Camino Real
 Cuatro Caminos
 La Merina
 La Quintana
 El Toral

References

Parishes in Villaviciosa